Rusnak is a surname. Notable people with the surname include:

 Albert Rusnák (disambiguation), several people
 Albert Rusnak (footballer, born 1994), Slovak footballer
 Darius Rusnak, Slovak ice hockey player
 Don Rusnak, Canadian politician
 John Rusnak, former currency trader
 Josef Rusnak, German screenwriter and director
 Michael Rusnak, member of the Redemptorist Fathers
 Nikolay Stepanovich Rusnak, better known as Metropolitan Nicodemus, former Ukrainian Orthodox metropolitan bishop of Kharkiv and Bohodukhiv
 Ondrej Rusnak, Slovak professional ice hockey player
 Peter Rusnak, bishop of the Eparchy of Bratislava
 Ron Rusnak, former American football player
 Rudolf Gerlach-Rusnak, born: Orest Rusnak, Ukrainian-born German tenor
 Stefan Rusnak, former football player from Slovakia and manager
 Thom Rusnak, bassist
 Urban Rusnak, Slovak diplomat and academic
 Vladimir Rusnak, former football player from Slovakia and manager